Brigantine Island (also known as Brigantine Beach Island) is an island off the Atlantic Ocean coast of New Jersey, located northeast of Atlantic City. The resort community of Brigantine is located on the island.

The island is accessible via Route 87, which terminates at the end of the Brigantine Bridge, after crossing the Absecon Inlet. After crossing the channel, the road's designation changes to County Route 638 (Brigantine Boulevard).

The Brigantine Lighthouse is a lighthouse on Brigantine Island. It was built in 1926 by the Island Development Real Estate Company to attract people to Brigantine Island and not as an operating lighthouse, somewhat like Lucy the Elephant to the south.

Geography
Brigantine Island is a barrier island along the Atlantic Ocean between Brigantine Inlet on the northeast, and Absecon Inlet on the southwest. The former Quarters Inlet originally separated Brigantine Island from Peters Beach on the southwest, but through sand deposition Brigantine Island has extended its length and enclosed Peters Beach; Quarters Inlet is now closed.

Brigantine Island was described in 1834 as,

In 1878 it was described,

By 1904, Quarters Inlet had taken on an "S" shape, curving in front of Peters Beach and separating it from Brigantine Island. By then known as Quarter Channel, it no longer connected directly with the ocean, but with Absecon Inlet.
By 1940, Quarters Channel had closed up, completing the connection with Brigantine Island.

See also
Peters Beach

References

External links
Brigantine Island Trail hiking

Brigantine, New Jersey
Landforms of Atlantic County, New Jersey
Tourist attractions in Atlantic County, New Jersey
Barrier islands of New Jersey
Islands of New Jersey